Raymond Suttner (born ) is South African activist, academic, journalist and public figure.

Education and activism
Suttner was born in Durban, South Africa. He obtained BA and LLB degrees from the University of Cape Town and an inter-disciplinary doctorate (history, sociology and political studies) from the University of the Witwatersrand in Johannesburg.

During the struggle against apartheid Suttner was in the leadership of the African National Congress (ANC), South African Communist Party and the United Democratic Front.

He served two prison terms under apartheid. He was sentenced to seven and a half years in 1975 for "taking part in the activities of an unlawful organisation" by distributing ANC literature, and "undergoing training or inciting or encouraging others to undergo training, or obtaining information which could be of use in furthering the achievements of any of the objects of communism or any unlawful organisation". He served his sentence in Pretoria Local, or Pretoria Prison, which was part of the Pretoria Central Prison complex, along with Denis Goldberg, Jeremy Cronin and others. He was there at the time of a daring escape in 1979 by Tim Jenkin, Stephen Lee and Alex Moumbaris.

Academic affiliations

He currently has academic affiliations at Rhodes University, the University of South Africa and the University of the Witwatersrand.

Personal life

Suttner was married to the academic, writer and activist Nomboniso Gasa.. They divorced in early 2021.

Publications

References

Further reading

External links

South African political scientists
South African activists
South African communists
Living people
Academic staff of Rhodes University
South African journalists
1945 births
White South African anti-apartheid activists
Writers from Durban
University of Cape Town alumni
University of the Witwatersrand alumni